Events from the year 1866 in art.

Events
 July 28 – 18-year-old Vinnie Ream is commissioned by the United States Congress to make a marble statue of Abraham Lincoln for the United States Capitol rotunda in Washington, D.C.
 Nationalmuseum opens in new premises in Stockholm, Sweden, under this name.

Works

 Albert Bierstadt – A Storm in the Rocky Mountains, Mt. Rosalie
 Carl Bloch – In a Roman Osteria
 Odoardo Borrani – At the Chorus
 Edward Burne-Jones – The Princess Sabra Led to the Dragon
 Julia Margaret Cameron – photographs
 The Mountain Nymph Sweet Liberty
 Series of Life Sized Heads
 Paul Cézanne – Portrait of Louis-Auguste Cézanne, Father of the Artist, reading l'Evénement (National Gallery of Art, Washington, D.C.)
 Jean-Baptiste-Camille Corot – Agostino (National Gallery of Art, Washington, D.C.)
 Gustave Courbet
 L'Origine du monde
 Le Sommeil
 Edgar Degas – Steeplechase – The Fallen Jockey
 Gustav Doré (woodcuts)
 Illustrations for La Grande Bible de Tours
 Illustrations for Milton's Paradise Lost
 Giovanni Fattori – La Rotonda di Palmieri
 Jean-Léon Gérôme
 Cleopatra and Caesar
 The Slave Market (approximate date)
 Francesco Hayez – Odalisque with Book
 David Octavius Hill – The First General Assembly of the Free Church of Scotland, Signing the Act of Separation and Deed of Demission at Tanfield, Edinburgh 23 May 1843 (completed)
 Winslow Homer – Prisoners from the Front (Metropolitan Museum of Art, New York)
 Sir Edwin Landseer – The Arab Tent (Wallace Collection, London; approximate date)
 August Malmström – Dancing Fairies
 Édouard Manet
 The Fifer (Musée d'Orsay, Paris)
 A King Charles Spaniel (National Gallery of Art, Washington, D.C.)
 Still Life with Melon and Peaches (National Gallery of Art, Washington, D.C.)
 Woman with a Parrot (Metropolitan Museum of Art, New York)
 Jan Matejko – Rejtan, or the Fall of Poland
 Claude Monet
 Camille (The Woman in the Green Dress)
 Le déjeuner sur l’herbe
 Women in the Garden (begun)
 Albert Joseph Moore
 The Last Supper and The Feeding of the Five Thousand (on chancel walls of church of St. Alban's, Rochdale; completed)
 The Shunamite relating the Glories of King Solomon to her Maidens
 Dante Gabriel Rossetti – The Beloved
 Rebecca Solomon – A Wounded Dove
 Simeon Solomon – Love in Autumn
 Bertalan Székely – The Battle of Mohács
 Frederick Walker – Wayfarers
 John Quincy Adams Ward – Indian Hunter (bronze)

Births
 January 23 – Lydia Field Emmet, American painter and designer (died 1952)
 March 17 – Alice Austen, American photographer (died 1952)
 June 13 – Aby Warburg, German art historian (died 1929)
 June 16 – Joaquín Clausell, Mexican impressionist landscape painter, lawyer and political activist (died 1935)
 July 3 – Ambroise Vollard, French art dealer (died 1939)
 July 14 – Juliette Wytsman, Belgian painter (died 1925)
 July 19 – John Duncan, Scottish painter (died 1945)
 July 28 – Beatrix Potter, English writer and illustrator (died 1943)
 August 9 – Emil Fuchs, Austrian-born sculptor and painter (died 1929)
 August 13 – Jadwiga Golcz, Polish photographer (died 1936)
 October 2 – Charles Ricketts, English designer (died 1931)
 unknown date – Milly Childers, English painter (died 1922)

Deaths
 January 15 – Massimo d'Azeglio, Italian statesman, novelist and painter (born 1798)
 January 17 – George Petrie, Irish painter, musician, antiquary and archaeologist (born 1790)
 January 27 – John Gibson, Welsh-born sculptor  (born 1790)
 January 30 –  Léon Bonvin, French painter an watercolorist (born 1834)
 March 23 – Ferdinand von Arnim, German architect and watercolour painter (born 1814)
 April 1 – Chester Harding, American portrait painter (born 1792)
 April 3 – Frederick William Fairholt, English engraver (born 1814)
 April 7 – Thomas Musgrave Joy, English portrait painter (born 1812)
 April 17 – Carl Georg Enslen, Austrian painter (born 1792)
 April 24 – Giuseppe Tominz, Austrian portrait painter (born 1790)
 April 26 – Hermann Goldschmidt, German-born painter and astronomer (born 1802)
 June 8 – William Bewick, English portrait painter (born 1795)
 June 14 – John Hayes, English portrait-painter (born 1786)
 August 9 – Raffaello Sernesi, Italian painter and medallist (born 1838)
 September 10 – David Hay, British interior decorator (born 1798)
 November 23 – Paul Gavarni (Sulpice Guillaume Chevalier), French caricaturist (born 1801/1804)
 December 20 – Jacobus Cornelis Gaal, Dutch painter and etcher (born 1796)
 date unknown – Jean Henri De Coene, Belgian painter of genre and historical subjects (born 1798)

 
Years of the 19th century in art
1860s in art